Yang Mu-sin (born 28 February 1942) is a South Korean weightlifter. He competed at the 1964 Summer Olympics and the 1968 Summer Olympics.

References

1942 births
Living people
South Korean male weightlifters
Olympic weightlifters of South Korea
Weightlifters at the 1964 Summer Olympics
Weightlifters at the 1968 Summer Olympics
Place of birth missing (living people)
20th-century South Korean people